Annalise is a feminine given name. Notable people with the name include:

Annalise Basso (born 1998), American actress and model
Annalise Braakensiek (1972–2019), Australian model, actress and television presenter
Annalise Murphy (born 1990), Irish sailor
Annalise Pickrel (born 1992), American women's basketball player

Fictional characters
Annalise Hartman, a character in the soap opera Neighbours.
Annalise Keating, main character in the television series How to Get Away with Murder.
Annalise Zazic, a character in the animated series Speed Racer: The Next Generation.

Feminine given names